John Gates (December 31, 1827 – April 27, 1888)  was the mayor of Portland, Oregon, United States, from 1885–1888. Born in Maine, he studied engineering in Massachusetts. He moved to California in 1849 and to Oregon in 1853. He found employment with the Oregon Steam Navigation Company (OSN), becoming its chief engineer in the early 1860s. He worked for OSN for 27 years. He designed 72 steamboats and was an inventor, filing more than 30 patents during his time with OSN.

Running as the Republican candidate, he was elected in 1885 to a three-year term as mayor of Portland, defeating Sylvester Pennoyer. He died while in office, two months before the end of his term.

References

External links
 John Gates, chief engineer for Oregon Steam Navigation Company

Mayors of Portland, Oregon
1827 births
1888 deaths
Oregon Steam Navigation Company
Oregon Republicans
19th-century American politicians
People from Mercer, Maine